Agylla venosa is a moth of the family Erebidae. It was described by William Schaus in 1894. It is found in Paraná, Brazil.

References

Moths described in 1894
venosa
Moths of South America